Olav Aasmund Smidsrød (9 November 1936 – 29 January 2017) was a Norwegian biochemist.

He was born in Sem. He took the siv.ing. degree in 1961 and the dr.ing. degree in 1971 at the Norwegian Institute of Technology, and was a professor at the University of Trondheim from 1977, later the Norwegian University of Science and Technology. He is known for his work with polymers, particularly heteropolysaccharides. In 2008 he was awarded the Gunnerus Medal. He is a fellow of the Norwegian Academy of Science and Letters and the Norwegian Academy of Technological Sciences.

References

1936 births
2017 deaths
People from Tønsberg
Norwegian biochemists
Norwegian Institute of Technology alumni
Academic staff of the Norwegian University of Science and Technology
Royal Norwegian Society of Sciences and Letters
Members of the Norwegian Academy of Science and Letters
Members of the Norwegian Academy of Technological Sciences